Werner Hans Rudolph Rosenkrantz Giedde  (4 October 1756 – 1816) was a Danish composer.

See also
List of Danish composers

References
This article was initially translated from the Danish Wikipedia.

Danish composers
Male composers
1756 births
1816 deaths